William Boyd (6 January 1726 – 29 August 1795) was an Irish Anglican priest.

Huson was born in County Kildare and educated at Trinity College, Dublin, He was Archdeacon of Leighlin from 1776 to 1777; and Archdeacon of Ferns from 1777 until his death.

Notes

Alumni of Trinity College Dublin
Irish Anglicans
1795 deaths
1726 births
People from County Kildare
Archdeacons of Leighlin
Archdeacons of Ferns